Bownes is a surname. Notable people with the surname include:

 Fabien Bownes (born 1972), American football player
 Hugh H. Bownes (1920–2003), American federal judge
 Mary Bownes (born 1948), British molecular and developmental biologist
 Shaun Bownes (born 1970), South African athlete

See also
 Bowne (surname)
 Bown (surname)
 Bowen (surname)
 Bowens (surname)